Thiệu Trị (lit. "inheritance of prosperity"; 6 June 1807 – 4 November 1847), personal name Nguyễn Phúc Miên Tông or Nguyễn Phúc Tuyền, was the third emperor of the Nguyễn dynasty. He was the eldest son of Emperor Minh Mạng, and reigned from 14 February 1841 until his death on 4 November 1847.

Biography

Emperor Thiệu Trị was much like his father, Minh Mạng, and carried on his conservative policies of isolationism and the entrenchment of Confucianism. Highly educated in the Confucian tradition, Thiệu Trị had some curiosity about the West, but like his father was very suspicious of all non-Vietnamese outsiders. At this same time, the French were in a colonial race with Great Britain and were pushing hard for stronger relations with Indochina. This, just as in the reign of Minh Mạng, also brought up Christian missionaries, mostly Spanish and French, who ignored the ban. When Trị began to imprison the missionaries, it prompted an immediate response from France. In 1843, the French government sent a military expedition to Indochina with orders to protect and defend French interests, free the illegal missionaries, if possible without causing an international incident.

Trị's determination to eliminate all Roman Catholic missionaries from his country could not be reconciled with a peaceful relationship with France. In 1845, this almost prompted a clash between Vietnam and the American warship USS Constitution which attempted to force Trị to free the missionary Dominique Lefèbvre, who had repeatedly come to Vietnam illegally multiple times. The French task force reached Tourane on 23 March 1847, and demanded that the safety of French nationals be assured and for Thiệu Trị to cease the persecution of missionaries.

The imperial mandarins put off delivering the emperor's reply and fighting broke out. Thiệu Trị had fortified the coast, but the French forces easily defeated the Vietnamese due to the Nguyễn dynasty's inferior equipment. All of the Vietnamese coastal forts were destroyed and three Nguyễn junks were sunk before the French squadron sailed away. Thiệu Trị called all missionaries enemy spies and demanded that all Christians should be executed on the spot. The mandarins did not put this order into effect and Emperor Thiệu Trị died shortly afterwards; no missionaries were actually ever executed during his reign.

Family

References

External links 

 
 

1807 births
1847 deaths
People from Huế
Emperors of Nguyen Vietnam
Nguyen dynasty emperors
19th-century Vietnamese monarchs
Vietnamese monarchs